This page provides supplementary chemical data on Trimethylarsine.

Material Safety Data Sheet  

The handling of this chemical may incur notable safety precautions. It is highly recommend that you seek the Material Safety Datasheet (MSDS) for this chemical from a reliable source  such as SIRI, and follow its directions.

Structure and properties

Thermodynamic properties

Spectral data

References

Chemical data pages
Chemical data pages cleanup